In Greek mythology, Dysnomia (means 'lawlessness') was the daemon of "lawlessness", who shares her nature with Atë ("ruin").  She was a companion of the latter deity, Adikia (Injustice), and Hybris (Violence). Dysnomia makes a rare appearances among other personifications in poetical contexts that are marginal in ancient Greek religion but become central to Greek philosophy: see Plato's Laws.

Family 
Dysnomia was imagined by Hesiod among the daughters of "abhorred Eris" ("Strife"). 

 "And hateful Eris bore painful Ponos ("Hardship"),
 Lethe ("Forgetfulness") and Limos ("Starvation") and the tearful Algea ("Pains"),
 Hysminai ("Battles"), Makhai ("Wars"), Phonoi ("Murders"), and Androktasiai ("Manslaughters");
 Neikea ("Quarrels"), Pseudea ("Lies"), Logoi ("Stories"), Amphillogiai ("Disputes")
 Dysnomia ("Lawlessness") and Ate ("Ruin"), near one another,
 and Horkos ("Oath"), who most afflicts men on earth,
 Then willing swears a false oath."

Mythology
In a surviving fragment of Solon's poems, a contrast is made to Eunomia, a name elsewhere given to one of the Horae, the embodiments of order. Both were figures of rhetoric and poetry; neither figured in myth or  Greek religious cult — although other personifications did, like Harmonia, "Agreement"; whether Harmonia is only a personification is debatable."This is what my heart bids me teach the Athenians, that Dysnomia (Lawlessness) brings the city countless ills, but Eunomia (Lawfulness) reveals all that is orderly and fitting, and often places fetters round the unjust. She makes the rough smooth, puts a stop to excess, weakens insolence (hubris), dries up the blooming of ruin (ate), straightens out crooked judgements, tames deeds of pride, and puts an end to acts of sedition and to the anger of grievous strife."

Legacy 
In 2005, Dysnomia was chosen as the name for the moon of the dwarf planet Eris.

Notes

Greek goddesses
Personifications in Greek mythology

References 

 Greek Elegaic Solon, Fragments - Greek Elegaic C6th B.C.

 Hesiod, Theogony from The Homeric Hymns and Homerica with an English Translation by Hugh G. Evelyn-White, Cambridge, MA.,Harvard University Press; London, William Heinemann Ltd. 1914. Online version at the Perseus Digital Library. Greek text available from the same website.

Children of Eris (mythology)
Eris (dwarf planet)
Daimons